Do the B-side is the eighth album from the popular Japanese band Do As Infinity. A limited edition of this album was released with an original T-shirt celebrating the fifth anniversary for the band. Footage of the concert is found in the Do As Infinity Live Year 2004 DVD. This B-side compilation album was released on September 23, 2004 under the AVEX Records label.

In the Taiwanese version of the limited version of Do The B-Side, the two CDs contained the opposite tracks from each other. This is not the first defect that the Taiwanese branch of Avex has made; other artists have had mistakes on the Taiwanese versions of their products as well.

Track listing

Chart positions

References

External links
 Do the B-side at Avex Network
 Do the B-side at Oricon

B-side compilation albums
Do As Infinity albums
2004 compilation albums
Avex Group compilation albums
Albums produced by Seiji Kameda